"(Baby) You Don't Have to Tell Me" (often written "You Don't Have to Tell Me") is a song by New York songwriter Pete Antell (formerly of the American pop group The Chants) and first recorded by singer Bobby Coleman. The obscure song was later recorded and released by the American pop group the Walker Brothers as their sixth single in 1966. The accompaniment was directed by Reg Guest.

"(Baby) You Don't Have to Tell Me" was a modest hit for the Walker Brothers, spending eight weeks on the UK Singles Chart and peaking at number 13. In comparison to their previous three singles, each of which made the top three, the single was a disappointment and marked the beginning of the group's popular decline. Despite the single's underperformance, Portrait, the group's second album, was released at the same time was much more popular, reaching number three on the UK Albums Chart.

In most territories the single was backed with "My Love Is Growing", a song co-written by Scott Walker's former musical partner John Stewart. In the US the single was backed by a Scott Walker-John Franz original, "Young Man Cried".

Track listing

Chart positions

References

1966 singles
The Walker Brothers songs
Year of song missing
Philips Records singles
Smash Records singles